Bernard Ato IV (died 1129) was the Viscount of Nîmes of the Trencavel family from 1074 to his death. Bernard Ato was the son of Raymond Bernard of Nîmes (died 1074) and Ermengarde of Carcassonne.

In 1096, Bernard joined the army of Raymond of Saint-Gilles to fight in the First Crusade.  After returning from the Holy Land, Bernard retook Carcassonne in 1125.

He married Cecilia of Provence, daughter of the Bertrand II of Provence, and had:
Bernard Ato V
Roger I
Raymond I Trencavel
Ermengard married Gausfred III of Roussillon.

References

Sources

1129 deaths
Occitan nobility
Trencavel
Christians of the 1113–1115 Balearic Islands expedition
Year of birth unknown
Christians of the First Crusade
Christians of the Crusade of 1101